Diaphus problematicus, the problematic lanternfish, is a species of lanternfish found worldwide.

Size

References

Myctophidae
Taxa named by Albert Eide Parr
Fish described in 1928